

September 

1:  World War II begins with the invasion of Poland by Nazi Germany.  The resulting invasion of Poland lasts until October 6, 1939, when the final significant Polish military forces surrender at Kock.  German operations are conducted under the operational plan Fall Weiss, while in Poland the campaign is referred to as the Polish Defense War of 1939.
2:  Polish forces at Wieluń surrender to the German 10th Army.
3:  The Polish Poznań Army proposes an attack against the German 8th Army.  The German flank is exposed, but the proposal is rejected.
4:  The Battle of Mława concludes as the Polish Modlin Army begins to retreat.
5:  Polish forces around Piotrków surrender to the 10th Army.
6:  Polish forces regroup along the Narew, Vistula, and San Rivers.  Kraków falls to the German 14th Army.
7:  The siege of Westerplatte concludes with the surrender of its remaining garrison.  Polish supreme command relocates to Brześć from Warsaw.  Defenses along the Narew begin withdrawal to the Bug River.  Tarnów falls to the 14th Army.
8:  The Siege of Warsaw begins the land phase with the arrival of German units in the suburbs.  The air bombardment had begun at the start of the Campaign.  The pocket at Radom is reduced by the 14th Army.
9:  The Battle of Bzura begins with a counter-attack against the German 8th Army.
12:  Białystok falls to the German 3rd Army
13:  The Vistula defenses are penetrated as German forces cross the river south of Warsaw.
14:  Germany captures Gdynia and Brest-Litovsk.  Siedlce is captured by the 3rd Army.
15:  The heaviest fighting of the Battle of Bzura concludes with the Germans having gained the advantage.  In the east, Przemyśl is captured by the 14th Army.
16:  The envelopment of Warsaw is completed.
17:  The eastern front of the Campaign opens with the invasion of Poland by the Soviet Union. Kutno falls to the German 8th Army and Brest-Litovsk (Brześć) falls to the 3rd Army.
18: Polish President Ignacy Mościcki and Commander-in-Chief Edward Rydz-Śmigły leave Poland for Romania, where they are both interned; Russian forces reach Vilna and Brest-Litovsk.
19:  Soviet forces capture Wilno.
20:  German and Soviet forces meet near Brest-Litovsk.
22:  Soviet forces capture Lwów. German–Soviet military parade in Brest-Litovsk.
27:  The Siege of Warsaw comes to an end as Polish forces surrender.  German forces enter the city on October 1, 1939.
28:  Polish government in exile set up in Paris with Raczkiewicz and Władysław Sikorski as Commander-in-Chief.

October
1:  The Hel Peninsula garrison surrenders to German forces.
2:  The Battle of Kock begins with a German advance.
5:  German victory parade is held in Warsaw.
6:  The Battle of Kock ends with the surrender of defending Polish forces.  This is the final significant military resistance to the German or Soviet invasions.

See also
 Timeline of World War II
 Timeline of Polish history

Poland
Invasion of Poland
Chronology of World War II
1939 in Poland